Jacobus Hermanus Hendrik Jan "Koos" de Jong (7 April 1912 – 20 August 1993) was a sailor from the Netherlands. He competed in the Firefly event at the 1948 Olympics and in the Finn event at the 1952 Games and won a bronze medal in 1948, placing fourth in 1952. De Jong won several medals at European championships, including the gold in 1959.

References

Sources

External links
 
 
 

1912 births
1993 deaths
Dutch male sailors (sport)
Medalists at the 1948 Summer Olympics
O-Jolle class sailors
Olympic bronze medalists for the Netherlands
Olympic medalists in sailing
Olympic sailors of the Netherlands
Sailors at the 1948 Summer Olympics – Firefly
Sailors at the 1952 Summer Olympics – Finn
Sportspeople from Rotterdam